Simulated Electronic Launch Peacekeeper (SELP) was a method used by the United States Air Force to verify the reliability of the LGM-118A Peacekeeper intercontinental ballistic missile.

SELM replaced key components at the Launch Control Center to allow a physical "keyturn" by missile combat crew members. This test allowed end-to-end verification of the ICBM launch process.

SELP was phased out with the deactivation of the Peacekeeper ICBM in 2005.

Logistics Support
The ICBM System Program Office at Hill AFB, Utah provided technical support to SELP tests The information obtained from tests provided a complete assessment of the weapon systems for Air Force Space Command (AFSPC).

See also
Simulated Electronic Launch Minuteman - similar verification test performed on LGM-30 Minuteman

References

Nuclear warfare
Cold War military equipment of the United States
United States nuclear command and control
United States Air Force